Hoobin is an Irish surname. Notable people with the surname include:

 Henry Hoobin, Canadian lacrosse player
 Jack Hoobin, Australian cyclist
 Pamela Hoobin, Australian politician

See also
 Hoban (surname)

References

Surnames of Irish origin